The Sackhorn is a mountain of the Bernese Alps, located on the border between the Swiss cantons of Bern and Valais. It lies on the range east of the Lötschen Pass, between the upper Gasterntal and the Lötschental. It lies approximately halfway between the Hockenhorn and the Birghorn.

References

External links
 Sackhorn on Hikr

Mountains of the Alps
Alpine three-thousanders
Mountains of Switzerland
Mountains of Valais
Mountains of the canton of Bern
Bern–Valais border
Bernese Alps